The mixed 4 × 400 metres relay at the 2022 World Athletics U20 Championships was held at the Estadio Olímpico Pascual Guerrero in Cali, Colombia on 1 and 2 August 2022.

Records

Results

Heats

Qualification: First 2 of each heat ( Q ) plus the 2 fastest times ( q ) qualified for the final.

Final
The final was held on 2 August at 16:59.

References

Relay 4 x 400 metres
Relays at the World Athletics U20 Championships